Lieutenant-General Sir George Mark Watson Macdonogh  (4 March 1865 – 10 July 1942) was a British Army general officer. After early service in the Royal Engineers he became a staff officer prior to the outbreak of the First World War. His main role in the war was as Director of Military Intelligence at the War Office in 1916–18.

Early career
He was born on 4 March 1865, son of George Valentine MacDonogh, Deputy Inspector of the Royal Naval Hospital, Greenwich. He was commissioned as a second lieutenant in the Royal Engineers on 5 July 1884. Ian Beckett comments that he had "considerable intellectual ability" but was "diffident and taciturn". He was promoted to captain on 22 October 1892.

In 1896 he entered Staff College by examination. The normal order of results was varied in order to conceal the fact that he and his contemporary James Edmonds were far ahead of the other entrants. Both men found their studies easy, and whilst Edmonds wrote a History of the American Civil War in his spare time MacDonogh studied law, qualifying as a barrister at Lincoln's Inn in 1897.

MacDonogh, who was fluent in several Scandinavian languages, married Aline Borgstrom of Helsingfors (now Helsinki) on 8 November 1898. They had one son, who died (of natural causes) in 1915.

From November 1898 to November 1899 he was Deputy Assistant Adjutant General, Royal Engineers, in Dublin. From December 1899 to August 1903 he was Secretary (brigade major) of the School of Military Engineering at Chatham. He was promoted to major on 1 April 1901. In 1903 he was appointed Deputy Assistant Quartermaster-General for Thames District. On 27 October 1906 he was appointed GSO3 in the War Office. In January 1908 he was appointed a GSO2. On 22 January 1909 he was promoted lieutenant-colonel. On 30 October 1912 he was promoted colonel. In December 1912 he was appointed a GSO1. He succeeded Edmonds as head of MO5, drafting measures to control aliens in the event of war. Henry Wilson, Director of Military Operations, distrusted him as a convert from Methodism to Roman Catholicism. In March 1914 Macdonogh was one of the few officers in the War Office willing to coerce Protestant Ulster during the Curragh incident.

First World War and after
In August 1914 he was appointed a GSO1 (Intelligence) at British Expeditionary Force GHQ. On 7 November 1914 he was promoted to Brigadier-General, General Staff. He performed distinguished service predicting enemy troop movements at the First Battle of Ypres and again predicting an enemy gas attack on Second Army in December 1915.

On William Robertson's promotion from Chief of Staff BEF to CIGS, Macdonogh was brought back to London. On 3 January 1916 he was promoted to Director of Military Intelligence at the War Office, with the rank of major-general. By May 1917 he had an accurate picture of the entire German Army in the west, except for a single Landwehr regiment. He helped to create the propaganda department MI7(b) which became very active from the summer of 1917. He conducted operations to reduce German domestic morale.

Macdonogh was distrusted by Haig and Haig's intelligence adviser John Charteris, with whom he had an acrimonious correspondence. He presented figures to the War Cabinet in October 1917, pouring cold water on Haig's predictions that German manpower would be exhausted by the end of the year. An infamous entry in Haig's diary (15 October 1917) mentions that Macdonogh "is a Roman Catholic and is (perhaps unconsciously) influenced by information which reaches him from tainted (that is, Catholic) sources". He also predicted the date, time and location of the German March 1918 "Michael" Offensive, as did Charteris.

He was appointed Adjutant-General to the Forces on 11 January 1918, a post he held until September 1922. He was promoted to temporary lieutenant-general in January 1919. He was considered for the position of British liaison officer with the White Russian leader Admiral Kolchak, but not appointed. He was promoted to permanent lieutenant-general on 10 September 1922. He retired from the Army on 11 September 1925.

He was appointed CB in 1915, KCMG in 1917, KCB in 1920 and GBE on retirement.

Post-military life
He served on the Royal Commission on Local Government 1923–1929. He held numerous directorships in business, banking and manufacturing, and was President of the Federation of British Industries in 1933–4. He was a Commissioner of the Imperial War Graves Commission. He was active in the London Zoological Society and the Royal Institute of International Affairs.

During the Winter War of 1939–40, when Finland was being attacked by the USSR he was President of the Anglo-Finnish Society, Vice-President of the Finland Fund, and a member of the Finnish Aid Bureau in 1940. In 1939-41 he served on the Control Committee for Regulation of Prices.

Death
He died on 10 July 1942, at Teddington, Middlesex. His estate was valued for probate at £53,784 1s 10d (over £2,000,000 at 2016 prices).

References

Sources
 , essay on Macdonogh written by Ian Beckett.
 Ian F. W. Beckett (2004) "Macdonogh, Sir George Mark Watson (1865–1942)", Oxford Dictionary of National Biography, Oxford University Press, Sept 2004; online edition, accessed 16 Oct 2008
 National Archives for: "Macdonogh, Sir George Mark Watson (1865-1942) Knight Lieutenant General"

|-
 

1865 births
1942 deaths
British Army lieutenant generals
British Army generals of World War I
English Roman Catholics
Knights Commander of the Order of St Michael and St George
Knights Commander of the Order of the Bath
Knights Grand Cross of the Order of the British Empire
MI5 personnel
Royal Engineers officers
English people of Irish descent
Graduates of the Staff College, Camberley
Spymasters
World War I spies for the United Kingdom
Directors of intelligence agencies